The 1901 Invercargill mayoral election was held on 24 April 1901 as part of that year's local elections.

South Ward councillor Francis Rose intended to contest the election but dropped out in September 1900 and subsequently resigned from the council for "private reasons".

Results
The following table gives the election results:

References

1901 elections in New Zealand
Mayoral elections in Invercargill